Ericsson 4 (also Groupama 70) is a Volvo Open 70 yacht. She won the 2008–09 Volvo Ocean Race skippered by Torben Grael.

References

2000s sailing yachts
Sailing yachts built in Sweden
Ships built in Stockholm
Sailboat type designs by Juan Kouyoumdjian
Sailing yachts of Sweden
Volvo Ocean Race yachts
Volvo Open 70 yachts
Sailing yachts of France
2008 ships